Cymax Group Technologies Ltd. is a privately held eCommerce company headquartered in Burnaby, British Columbia, Canada. The Cymax Group of brands includes two retail websites, Cymax Business and Home Square, which sell furniture and decor; plus Freight Club and Channel Gate, which are eCommerce logistics and technology enablement platforms.

History
Cymax Group was founded in 2004 by Arash Fasihi as an online retailer. The company developed a vendor portal and around 170 micro-sites. Currently, Cymax Group operates two online retail properties, Cymax Business and Home Square.

A Series A funding round in 2015, led by Frind Holdings, Salman Partners and BDC Capital Corporation, brought the organization's total funding amount to $25 million.

The same year, the company launched Freight Club in the US with 100+ carriers offering nationwide drop shipping services at enterprise rates. Freight Club offers application programming interfaces that integrate with core systems. In 2020, Freight Club launched a cart-level, real-time shipping quote integration on the Shopify app store.

In 2018, the company launched Channel Gate, offering a digital supply chain platform for furniture manufacturers.

In 2019, Rizwan Somji was appointed chief executive officer of Cymax Group. Under his leadership, the organization has increased focus and investment of resources on the development of technology in support of simplifying eCommerce for partners and consumers through machine learning, artificial intelligence, and advanced analytics.

In 2020, in response to unprecedented demand for online shopping due to the COVID-19 pandemic, Cymax Group helped members and clients with tools needed to accelerate eCommerce strategies.

Awards
Cymax Group was a finalist at the 2020 Digital Transformation Awards.

Ratings
2007 – Ranked 247th in the Internet Retailer Top 500 Internet Companies index 
2008 – Ranked 200th in the Internet Retailer Top 500 Internet Companies index
2009 – Ranked 167th in the Internet Retailer Top 500 Internet Companies index
2010 – Ranked 168th in the Internet Retailer Top 500 Internet Companies index

References

External links
 

Online retailers of Canada
Furniture retailers of Canada
Consumer electronics retailers of Canada
Companies based in Burnaby
Retail companies established in 2004
2004 establishments in British Columbia